Bully Records was an independent record label founded in 2002 in Montreal. It is maintained, funded, and run by Marc-Olivier Boileau (Marco). The label first released mostly 7-inch singles and EPs, but has since expanded to release CDs, box sets, and DVDs.

Most of Bully's lineup consists mainly of hip hop producers. They have since branched out and released the work of instrumentalists from many different genres.

One example of their projects is Obsession, a compilation of rare psychedelic music from countries such as Peru, Turkey, India, Brazil, Uruguay and Argentina. It was compiled by Mike Davis, owner of Academy Records in New York City.

Discography

7" singles

EPs

Albums

DVDs

External links
Bully Records
Bully Records on Myspace

Canadian independent record labels
Companies based in Montreal
Record labels established in 2002